Leucopogon capitellatus is a species of flowering plant in the heath family Ericaceae and is endemic to the south-west of Western Australia. The flowers are borne on short spikes on the ends of branches or in leaf axils on short side branches, with small bracts and bracteoles about half as long as the sepals.

It was first formally described in 1839 by Augustin Pyramus de Candolle in his Prodromus Systematis Naturalis Regni Vegetabilis from specimens collected by James Drummond in the Swan River Colony. The specific epithet (capitellatus) means "forming a small head". 

This leucopogon grows in a variety of habitats in the Jarrah Forest, Swan Coastal Plain and Warren bioregions of south-western Western Australia and is listed as "not threatened" by the Western Australian Government Department of Biodiversity, Conservation and Attractions.

References

capitellatus
Ericales of Australia
Flora of Western Australia
Plants described in 1839
Taxa named by Ferdinand von Mueller